The women's long jump at the 2002 European Athletics Championships were held at the Olympic Stadium on August 6–7.

On 8 March 2013, the IAAF announced that following retesting of samples taken at the championships, it had been found that Tatyana Kotova of Russia had taken a banned substance. It was not announced whether this would mean an alteration in the medal result.

Medalists

Results

Qualification
Qualification: Qualification Performance 6.60 (Q) or at least 12 best performers advance to the final.

Final

External links
Results

Long
Long jump at the European Athletics Championships
2002 in women's athletics